Isoma is a village in the municipal unit of Farres, Achaea, Greece. It is 2 km northwest of Fares and 16 km south of Patras. Isoma had a population of 452 in 2011. Isoma is situated in the plain between the rivers Peiros and Parapeiros.

Population

See also
List of settlements in Achaea

References

External links
 
 Isoma at the GTP Travel Pages

Populated places in Achaea